The Beaver Coat is a 1937 German comedy film directed by Jürgen von Alten and starring Heinrich George, Ida Wüst, and Rotraut Richter. It is an adaptation of Gerhart Hauptmann's play The Beaver Coat. The German premiere took place on 3 December 1937. Another film version of the play The Beaver Coat was released in 1949.

Cast

See also
The Beaver Coat (1928 film)
The Beaver Coat (1949 film)

References

External links

German comedy films
1937 comedy films
Films directed by Jürgen von Alten
German films based on plays
Films based on works by Gerhart Hauptmann
German black-and-white films
1930s German films